Čevo, historically also known as Kčevo (Кчево), is a village in the municipality of Cetinje, Montenegro.

History
The village was held by the Ozrinići tribe of the Katunska nahija. Five families of the Ozrinići founded the settlement of Ozrinići in the Nikšić area in 1657.

Demographics

Notable people
Milena Vukotić (1848–1923), Queen consort of Montenegro
Janko Vukotić (1866–1927), Montenegrin politician and general.
Vasilija Vukotić (1897–1970), Montenegrin military heroine of World War I

References

Populated places in Cetinje Municipality